Merry Hill (formerly Westfield Merry Hill and The Merry Hill Shopping Centre) is a large shopping complex in Brierley Hill near Dudley, England. It was developed between 1985 and 1990, with several subsequent expansion and renovation projects. The centre is anchored by Marks & Spencer, Primark, Asda, Next and formerly Debenhams.

The centre has over 200 shops, a retail park, cinema, food court and 10,000 parking spaces. Adjacent to the main shopping mall is a marina called The Waterfront accommodating a number of bars, restaurants, the studios of Black Country Radio, and the Headquarters and Control Room of West Midlands Ambulance Service. The Dudley No.1 Canal passes through The Waterfront and along the edge of the shopping centre before descending to Delph Locks.

The centre's original developers and owners were Richardson Developments. Savills carry out the day-to-day management of Merry Hill and strategic planning and asset management is by Sovereign Centros on behalf of the current owners.

History

Background
At the beginning of the 1980s, the recently elected Conservative government of Margaret Thatcher created a number of enterprise zones to attract businesses to areas of high unemployment that had resulted from the down-sizing or closure of major industrial concerns. On 29 October 1980, Chancellor Geoffrey Howe announced that Dudley Council's application for an enterprise zone near to Brierley Hill had been successfuI. The enterprise zone included Merry Hill Farm, a large open green space cherished locally as a haven for wildlife. It was anticipated that the enterprise zone would help replace some of the lost jobs in manufacturing. Incentives for business included a relaxation of planning rules, enhanced capital allowances on industrial and commercial buildings, exemption from Development Land Tax and a ten-year exemption from business rates. In December 1982, the neighbouring Round Oak Steelworks closed with the loss of around 1,300 jobs; later, the enterprise zone was extended to include the Round Oak site. Jobs were created in the small and medium-sized units built by developers on trading estates, but no large-scale manufacturing business had been attracted to the enterprise zone. Oldbury-based, Richardson Developments who had bought both the Merry Hill Farm and Round Oak sites decided to focus on retail and leisure, rather than manufacturing for Merry Hill Farm.

Construction

Shopping centre and retail park
Despite protests from some local residents over construction taking place on the green space, rather than on the former steelworks site, the first phase of the project went ahead and by Christmas 1985 a Queensway furniture store, MFI home furnishings retail warehouse (the very first tenant) and Atlantis Electrical superstore were all trading. Shortly before this, the developers announced plans to triple the amount of retail floorspace at Merry Hill within 18 months, subject to Dudley Council's approval. Early 1986 saw the opening of Halfords and B&Q.

The building contract for the shopping malls was awarded to Tarmac Construction.

A Carrefour hypermarket opened on 1 July 1986 as part of the first phase of the indoor shopping centre, but closed within two years, its place taken by a Gateway supermarket. Asda had replaced Gateway by 1990 and have held the tenancy ever since. The ground floor of the shopping mall was extended during 1987 and an upper shopping level added in early 1988. A separate 10-screen cinema opened in November 1988. The 350-seat Jules Verne food court, which offered a round-the-world eating experience and had a large globe-shaped balloon as its centrepiece, opened in June 1989 on the upper level; however, it closed within five years due to disappointing trade and was subdivided into additional retail units.

Construction of the final phase of the centre was completed in 1989. A Sainsbury's supermarket and Burger King fast-food outlet opened in September and department stores, Debenhams and British Home Stores in November. Marks and Spencer opened on 23 October 1990, two months after the closure of its West Bromwich and Dudley stores on 25 August. This part of the shopping centre was partly remodelled in 1996, a mere seven years after it had been built.

Access to the complex was improved in 1998 by alterations to the two junctions with the A4036 Dudley – Pedmore road. More than 40 houses were demolished to make way for the widened road and re-designed Quarry Bank junction.

Merry Hill had brought about the first free-standing Pizza Hut in the UK, the first drive-thru McDonald's restaurant and the largest Texas Homecare store — all opened during 1986.

While the centre was still being developed in the late 1980s, plans were unveiled to build the world's tallest tower at Merry Hill. The tower would have been 2,000 feet tall, with a hotel at its base, a restaurant halfway up and a nightclub plus observatory at the top. However, plans to build it were scrapped in 1992.

The Waterfront
Redevelopment of the Round Oaks steelworks site did not commence until 1989, when construction began on The Waterfront development, which consisted of Phases 6–8. Waterfront Way was opened in December 1990 to serve the new complex and provide a road link to the shopping centre and also to the main A461 road between Dudley and Stourbridge.

The Waterfront development created some 4,000 jobs, but the onset of another recession in 2008 saw many businesses vacate the development, leaving a high percentage of office units empty. In June 2011, in a bid to bring jobs back to the Waterfront, the area was among the candidates for enterprise zone status once again — 17 years after the original enterprise zone expired.

Ownership
Ownership of the shopping centre has changed hands several times over the years. The initial developer and owner was a business set up by entrepreneurial twin brothers Don and Roy Richardson, who grew up near the site. The 1989 expansion of the centre was a joint venture between the Richardsons and Tony Clegg's publicly listed Mountleigh and by late 1990 the Richardsons had sold their interest in the shopping centre to Mountleigh.

Mountleigh's ownership was to be short-lived. The Merry Hill Centre was soon put up for sale by Mountleigh's new American owners to pay down the company's debt pile. In January 1992, a sale was agreed, but fell through possibly due to what were later, unfounded land contamination issues. In May 1992, it was announced that receivers were to be appointed by Mountleigh's bankers and it was not until February 1993 that Merry Hill was sold by the receivers to Elliott Bernerd's London property company, Chelsfield and an undisclosed international partner.

Chelsfield bought out its investment partner's share in stages and by June 1996 had assumed full ownership of the shopping centre. Westfield, the Australian-owned shopping centre group took over the Merry Hill Centre as a member of the consortium that acquired Chelsfield in December 2004, but two years later sold 50 per cent to fund manager, Queensland Investment Corporation.

Intu Properties purchased Westfield's 50 per cent in March 2014 and became full owners in June 2016 after buying out Queensland Investment Corporation. In June 2020, Intu became Merry Hill's second owner to enter administration, after Mountleigh 28 years earlier.

Effect on surrounding towns

Prior to the first retail unit opening, planning officials working for Dudley Council warned of the adverse effect the proposed shopping centre would likely have on shops in nearby Brierley Hill, Quarry Bank and Stourbridge. Neighbouring local authorities and West Midlands County Council agreed and sought to curb retail development within the enterprise zone, fearing the effect retail provision at Merry Hill would have on the wider area. The Evening Mail newspaper advised careful consideration but viewed job creation within the enterprise zone as the priority, whether from manufacturing or retail. In February 1986, the chairman of the West Midlands strategic planning committee took the "unprecedented" step of writing to leading retailers, spelling out the "strong opposition" to further expansion of retail at Merry Hill. Environment Secretary,Kenneth Baker had given Dudley Council the power to amend the enterprise zone conditions, but despite his urging, Dudley councillors decided by a single vote to back developer, Don and Roy Richardson's plans.

When the Merry Hill Centre first opened, a number of large retail chains decided to move their stores from surrounding towns into the new shopping centre. These included: Marks & Spencer, C&A (C&A left the UK during 2001 and the store was reoccupied by H&M) Littlewoods. The Littlewoods store was taken over by Marks & Spencer in the late 1990s, with a menswear store and cafe opening in its place.

The exodus of retailers from neighbouring towns, mainly Dudley and to a lesser degree Stourbridge and Halesowen, left a number of large empty premises behind, which in turn meant many shoppers abandoned town centres for the Merry Hill Centre, which led to a large downturn in trade for those shops remaining, affecting their viability.

The first retailer to move to Merry Hill was furniture retailer MFI, who opened a retail warehousing unit during the autumn of 1985. MFI would trade from this unit for 23 years until they went into liquidation in December 2008, with the store having since been occupied by a string of different retailers.

By Christmas 1985, MFI had been joined by Queensway furniture store and electrical retailer Atlantis. Further retail warehousing units and a shopping mall were already under construction by this stage.

By the spring of 1986, two retail parks were operating from the site, incorporating retailers including B&Q, Halfords and Texas Homecare, as well as the centre's first indoor shopping mall.

The first phase of the indoor shopping centre opened in April 1986, with French hypermarket giant Carrefour opening a store at the centre on 1 July that year. They sold the store to Gateway Foodmarkets two years later when withdrawing from the UK, and by 1990 it had been taken over by Asda, who already had a store in Brierley Hill as well as several others in the wider Black Country area, but surprisingly, the Brierley Hill store remained open.

A second shopping centre opened on the ground level in 1987 and the centre was expanded further in early 1988 to include an upper level, although the bulk of the centre was opened on 14 November 1989 - by which time it was the largest shopping centre in Europe. By the time of its completion, Merry Hill included several multiple stores including clothing retailers: C&A and Littlewoods, general department store British Home Stores and supermarket chain Sainsburys, as well as numerous smaller retailers.

On 23 October 1990, Marks & Spencer opened a new department store at Merry Hill (the final new store to open at the complex), replacing the recently closed stores in nearby Dudley and West Bromwich. The retailer had agreed to become tenants of a store at Merry Hill during the summer of 1989, but had hoped to keep their Dudley and West Bromwich stores open alongside it; however the declining trade in both of these towns led to both stores being closed on 25 August 1990, some two months before the Merry Hill store opened. A similar situation had arisen with British Home Stores, who had opened a store in the final phase of the complex in November 1989, but continued to trade from its Dudley store; however the opening of the Merry Hill store was followed by a sharp decline in trade from the Dudley store, and the decision to close this store had been taken by March 1990, with the store finally closing June of that year.

in the autumn of 1991, the Marks & Spencer store expanded on the ground level into a neighbouring unit which had been vacated.

In the late-1990s, Marks & Spencer took over the lease of the former Littlewoods store and converted into a furniture and menswear store. The Littlewoods store had expanded some years earlier, taking in a former Woolworths store on the upper level; there had been fears that Woolworths would close at least some of their branches in nearby towns when the Merry Hill store opened, but trade from the Woolworths at Merry Hill was relatively disappointing and ironically most of the local Woolworths stores all outlasted the Merry Hill store by nearly two decades, only closing when the retailer went into liquidation over the 2008/09 winter.

The completion of Merry Hill resulted in the loss of many big name retailers from nearby town centres, with Dudley being the hardest hit, suffering a 70% decline in retailing market share between 1985 and 1990. However, some retailers kept their stores in nearby towns open, despite opening new stores at Merry Hill. C&A, who had a store at Merry Hill from November 1989 until withdrawing from the UK in 2001, kept their Dudley store open until January 1992. Littlewoods kept their Dudley store open for two months after its Merry Hill replacement opened in November 1989, cashing in on the 1989 Christmas market before closing in January 1990. British Home Stores had intended to continue trading from their Dudley store, but a sharp fall in trade following the Merry Hill store's opening led to the decision to close the Dudley store, which ceased trading in June 1990.

A further blow came when the local council, Dudley Metropolitan Borough, announced that it was bringing in parking charges throughout the area; this turned more shoppers away from local town centres, and towards the Merry Hill Centre, where parking remains free. Though there have since been plans for introducing parking charges at the centre, this has been criticised due to fears of impacting trade.

In 2008, Merry Hill Centre, along with nearby Brierley Hill, was redesignated as the 'strategic town centre' of the Dudley Borough, and thus the focus of future local government investment.

The Merry Hill Centre continues to draw most of its trade from the local area. The developers did plan that the centre would attract visitors from across the country, by building coach parks; however, the centre failed to attract nationwide visitors as anticipated and the coach parks were redeveloped with private housing and flats in 2003.

Monorail

An elevated monorail was opened at Merry Hill in June 1991, but closed in 1996 as a result of a combination of technical problems and safety concerns (especially the difficulty of evacuation), exacerbated by a dispute between the owners of Merry Hill and The Waterfront, which at the time were owned separately.  The infrastructure was later removed, leaving only one disused monorail station and part of the old railings visible—on top of the Marks and Spencer store roof.

The monorail cost £22 million to build, the construction work taking place along with the final phase of the shopping complex in 1988–89, but due to health and safety concerns, it did not open until 19 months after the centre was complete.

There were to be five stations, with the system extending over the canal and terminating close to the site of the former Round Oak railway station where an interchange with a West Midlands Metro extension was proposed. However, only the first four stations were completed; Waterfront East, Central Station, Times Square and Boulevard; with Waterfront West planned as a future development.

The system was officially opened on 1 June 1991. The actual public opening was delayed while Her Majesty's Railway Inspectorate investigated evacuation procedures. After operating for a short while, the monorail was temporarily closed again in 1992, but ran sporadically until 1996.

After the system was put up for sale in 1996, the trains and track were transferred in 2001 to the Oasis Shopping Centre, in Broadbeach, Queensland, Australia, to enable expansion of its own monorail system. The remaining monorail station, Central Station, was perfectly preserved, but due to renewed interest in 2016 surrounding the 25th anniversary of its opening artefacts were removed from the station and placed in a memorial exhibition near the lift shaft which once gave access to it. One hundred and fifty commemorative coins were minted and sold at the exhibition.

By the end of the monorail's life at the centre, tickets for adults cost 40p while children under the age of 5 enjoyed free travel on the network. A 'monorail replacement bus' service operated between the UCI Cinema (now Odeon) and The Waterfront car parks once the monorail ceased operating, utilising two Travel Merry Hill owned MCW Metrobuses.

Main centre

The centre has around 217 stores and over 10,000 free parking spaces, with a total retail floorspace of  making the centre the eighth largest in the United Kingdom, behind Westfield London, the MetroCentre, Bluewater, Trafford Centre and Westfield Stratford City.

Eat Central
Located on the Upper Mall, Eat Central was opened on October 22, 2009, by TV chef James Martin at the cost of £24 Million to the centres then owners Westfield Group. The food court features a unique lighting system developed by into lighting to lessen the use of more traditional downlights and reused the Eat Central branding from Westfield Derby (Derbion) which opened two years earlier, despite that centre losing the Eat Central branding in 2017. 

On opening, Eat Central consisted of 16 eatery units in the main food court and 3 two-story restaurant units to the rear. However, this has since been reduced to one unit is being occupied by retailer Max Spielmann and another unit at the entrance to the food court, now being used as extra seating, was previously occupied by the now-defunct retailer Phones 4u. Additionally, one of the 3 restaurant units to the rear has remained empty since opening. Opening day eateries consisted of; Nando's, Pizza Express, Burger King, KFC, Subway, Napoli Italian, Oporto (Chicken & Burgers), Tiffinbites (Asian), Nineteen Ten Mexican, Yangtze Express, Zetao Noodles and Sushi, Crepescape, Muffin Break Expresso and Harpers English classics. The Pizza Express closed in late 2020 as part of a wider restructuring of the company.

Stores 
The centre has space for 5 anchors. These currently consist of;   Marks & Spencer, Primark, Asda and Next. The centre also had a Debenhams, which was used as a liquidation store in early 2021 as a part of the wider administration process for the company and closed on 15 May 2021. It also contains a range of other major brands and privately operated stores. Notable names are; H&M, TK Maxx, Sports Direct and Boots.

Chronological updates:

 November 2020 - Boots saw a Mothercare concession open inside of it. 
 July 25, 2021 - Hamleys opens its first store in the Black Country located on the Lower Mall in the place previously occupied by Carphone Warehouse.
 September 15, 2021 - A conceptual Primark Home location opens, expanding the store further.
 September 25, 2021 - The Disney Store closed after 25 years at the centre, this was part of a wider wind down of the global Disney Store operations.
November 5, 2021 - Smyths Toy Superstores opened on the retail park.

Retail park
Beyond the main shopping centre is a separate retail park which has a number of shops and restaurants and also a cinema. Stores in this area include Wren Kitchens, Oak Furniture Land, Bensons for Beds, The Range, Currys, B&M Home & Garden, Carpetright, Halfords, Pets at Home and Matalan among others. In April 2021, Lidl announced plans to open a store in the former Ultimate Outdoors unit. This opened later the same year.

Cinema
There is a ten-screen Odeon Cinema situated on the retail park. It was the first multiplex cinema in the Dudley borough and the first new one to have been built for some fifty years. It was originally owned by AMC Cinemas and later sold to UCI Cinemas. It was refurbished following the 2005 merger with the Odeon Cinemas chain.

Recent developments
The owners and local council leaders have stated their aim to better connect and integrate Merry Hill with the traditional town centre of Brierley Hill. The Dudley Canal was re-routed in the late-1990s, and between 2002 and 2005, housing has been developed around the complex (several apartment blocks opposite the cinema as well as apartments and houses overlooking Pedmore Road). A new line of the West Midlands Metro tram system was scheduled to reach the site in 2011, but is now planned to open late 2023 (see below for update).

In July 2017, plans were revealed to expand the centre to include more restaurants and to open a new Odeon cinema inside the centre to replace the old multiplex at the retail park. These plans were put forward after Intu acquired the existing Odeon Cinemas building and would have been built at the rear of the centre, connecting to phase 1 of the centre and would have doubled the amount of leisure and entertainment located at the centre from 5% to 10%. However, as of early 2021 the aging multiplex continues to operate on the retail park and no further plans or information has been released following the 2017 announcement.

In 2018, a new 75,000 sq ft flagship Next store opened replacing the Sainsbury's store that closed on 31 December 2016.

The 2021 expansion and improvement 
It was announced on September 26, 2021, that the centre would undergo a 5-year improvement and expansion plan with the plan to be the "Ultimate family shopping and leisure destination in the West Midlands". While the expansions are still in the early planning there are plans to divide the centre into new districts focusing on entertainment, fashion & health and wellbeing along with others. Early concept art shows the new area containing a new Odeon cinema and the expansion linking into the existing Eat Central area. Along with this, there are plans to improve connections to The Waterfront and wider surrounding areas.

Transport

Bus station
A bus station has served Merry Hill since its opening, but the current, more substantial bus station was developed in the early 1990s and gives direct connections to towns including Dudley, Halesowen, Stourbridge, Walsall, West Bromwich and Cradley Heath as well as the cities of Birmingham and Wolverhampton.

Similarly, the bus services connect the centre to Cradley Heath railway station, for West Midlands Trains services to Birmingham Snow Hill, Kidderminster and Worcester via Stourbridge Junction.

Various distance bus services from Merry Hill are operated by Diamond West Midlands and National Express West Midlands.

Bus Services

West Midlands Metro Line Two
Transport for West Midlands (TfWM) will open a new line of the West Midlands Metro from Wednesbury to Brierley Hill, with a new stop at Merry Hill, planned to open in 2023. The line was first planned in 1986 and was expected to be built during the 1990s, but funding and planning difficulties resulted in a 30-year delay to this project becoming a reality.

In culture
The areas around Next, TK Maxx, H&M, Eat Central, the amphitheatre and outside Debenhams at Merry Hill made an appearance on the popular Cartoon Network show, The Amazing World of Gumball as "Elmore Mall" in the episode called "The Mothers", Eat Central also made an appearance in the episode called "The Burden". Interior and exterior shots of Merry Hill have also featured in subsequent episodes.

Working at Merry Hill gave Catherine O'Flynn the inspiration for the fictional Green Oaks centre, the main location in her successful novel What Was Lost.

The former Sainsbury's at Merry Hill was featured in the third episode of the first series of the popular children's television programme Rosie and Jim, called "Supermarket" which was originally broadcast on ITV on 17 September 1990, and featured the boat's owner John Cunliffe going shopping at Sainsbury's, with the ragdolls Rosie and Jim in tow.

References

External links

Merry Hill website
Gallery of photographs of Merry Hill shopping centre in 1990 and 2020

Brierley Hill
Buildings and structures in the Metropolitan Borough of Dudley
Bus stations in the West Midlands (county)
Shopping centres in the West Midlands (county)
Shopping malls established in 1985
1985 establishments in England